Mountain Lake House (MLH) was a resort located in Smithfield Township, Monroe County, Pennsylvania, where route U.S. Route 209 and Pennsylvania Route 402 meet in Marshalls Creek, Pennsylvania. The resort is now closed.

According to a 1999 Environmental Impact Study that evaluated the impact of a proposed road, the Mountain Lake House then was "an approximately  estate with approximately 18 outbuildings including a musician's cabin, recreational hall, guest house, workshop," and more.

History

The history of Mountain Lake House traced its roots to 1902 when Harvey Huffman purchased a 113-acre parcel of land just outside Marshalls Creek village. On the property were one or two farmhouses on the North side of Pond Creek (Which would later become Marshall Lake). The main house was described in 1915 as a 12-room boarding house. Harvey was the son of E.D. Huffman, who ran several businesses in Marshalls Creek, including a hotel and general store. Harvey was an attorney who would later become a prominent Pennsylvania State Senator. Two other brothers, Jay and Norman, played a significant role in MLH. In 1902 Norman was managing a lumber mill in Marshalls Creek, and Jay operated a horse and carriage livery. At this time, ice harvesting was quite lucrative in the Poconos, so Harvey, Jay, and Norman made plans to dam Pond Creek to harvest ice. Between 1904 and 1906, a dam was finally constructed on the lands of Norman Huffman, which backed up water onto the grounds of Harvey Huffman. Their ice-harvesting operation would continue until the 1920s. 

In 1906, the ownership of 34 acres of Harvey Huffman's original 113-acre parcel became vested in his brother, Jay Huffman. This parcel was located on the North shore of the lake and comprised the heart of the Mountain Lake House. All of the major buildings, except the cottage colony and Lakeside Motel would be located on these 34 acres. It is at this time that Jay and his wife, Edith, founded the Lake Marshall Hotel as a boarding house for tourists in summer and to support the ice harvesting effort in winter. In winter, it was common for farmers to live in boarding houses near ice harvesting operations since there was very little farm work to be done. Initially, the boarding house may have been managed by various proprietors, including George Transue in 1911 and Farley Pipher who ran the business from 1914 to 1918. At some point between 1910 and 1911, the name was changed from Lake Marshall Hotel to Mountain Lake House. Early tourists in the area came for bicycle riding or motoring along the Milford Road (now Route 209). There were also many other leisure attractions including “taking the healing waters,” swimming, boating, fishing, and hunting. 

In 1918, Jay Huffman took over the management of Mountain Lake House himself and added a major addition to the east side of the original boarding house. With the help of his wife, Edith, and his eight children, Mountain Lake House became one of the premiere full-service resorts in the Poconos. Jay's daughter Miriam wrote a postcard to friends in 1920 speaking fondly of running the MLH. The period between 1918 and 1924 saw a number of new buildings added to the complex including stables, auto and carriage livery, the dance hall, the tennis courts, and additional guest quarters. We believe the famous letters “Mountain Lake House” were added to the front lawn in the late 1920s. Shortly after in the early 1930s “Marshalls Creek, Pa” was added beneath the Mountain Lake House letters. 

The pool was added in 1937. Prior to the addition of the pool, guests would swim in Marshall Lake. There was even a swim platform out in the lake. From the very beginning of the lake, row boating was extremely popular. Even guests from neighboring hotels would come to use the row boats on the lake. A wooden footbridge, with an elevated section to allow boats to pass under, crossed over the lake from at least 1908 until perhaps the early 1950s. The footbridge followed the path of an old lane that crossed Pond Creek, leading from the Milford Road (Route 209) to the Mountain Lake House prior to the construction of the dam. 

Construction of the area known as the Cottage Colony began in 1925. Situated off Route 402 across the road from Mountain Lake House, it consisted of eight bungalows and families usually stayed there for the entire summer. The cottages were built one at a time, as needed, and each was named for one of Jay's children. Although the colony offered none of the amenities of Mountain Lake House, its residents enjoyed the use of the facilities that Mountain Lake House offered. In 1981 the Cottage Colony was sold to a neighboring resort, Mountain Manor. Although Mountain Manor and the Cottage Colony still stand as of this writing, neither is in operation. 

In 1940, Jay Huffman died and the ownership of MLH passed to his wife, Edith. Jay's son Elwood took over the management of Mountain Lake House at this time. A large man, Elwood could always be seen overseeing the property with his dog, "Cappy." Elwood continued to manage the resort until 1961. Around 1943, Edith added the property known as "The Marshalls Falls House" to the family's growing resort business. They changed the name of the building, which stood at the junction of Business Route 209 and Route 402, to "The Village Inn" and turned it into a shining example of luxury country accommodations. Complete with a gift shop and ornate billiards room, the Village Inn could house 140 guests and was managed by Norman Huffman (Jay's son) until it was replaced by a shopping center in February 1980. 

In 1961, Norman Huffman, Jay's son and Elwood's brother, added management of Mountain Lake House to his already busy schedule. During the 1960s the Lake Side Motel was added. Norman continued to manage the property until his brother, Carlyle, purchased the Mountain Lake House holdings from the rest of the family and installed his son, Bob, as manager in 1971. 

Mountain Lake House officially closed its doors for the last time in September 2000. The resort remained idle until it was sold to Richard Blewitt in 2004. Mr. Blewitt's dream of reopening the resort (to be called Rich's Promise) as a haven for the families of active-duty military personnel was never to be realized.

In 2004 vandals burned down the Rec Hall and in 2006 the Marshalls Creek Volunteer Fire Department demolished the remaining wood-frame structures in a controlled burn. 

, the only remaining structures on the property were a pool, barn, tennis courts, and the Lakeside Motel. Vegetation is quickly taking over the site and hiding what little remains. The asphalt lanes and parking lots are the only areas resistant to the growth of vegetation, otherwise, the site is largely unrecognizable and inaccessible.

Historic activities
The resort was a stop on the Mountain View Trolley Line.

Big Band leader Harry James "was among a number of celebrities who visited Mountain Lake House."

The Mountain Lake House had tennis courts, volleyball, shuffleboard, an arcade, bocci ball, basketball, softball, golfing, putt-putt golf, boating, a pool, a dance hall, and a movie room. In the late '80s, an indoor pool and sauna/hot tub were added.

Preservation
The Mountain Lake House Resort was eligible for protection under the Pennsylvania Historical Museum Commission Bureau for Historic Preservation.

See also
Monroe County, Pennsylvania
U.S. Route 209 Business (Stroudsburg, Pennsylvania)

References

Resorts in Pennsylvania
Pocono Mountains
Buildings and structures in Monroe County, Pennsylvania
1918 establishments in Pennsylvania